Jagenburg is a Germanic surname. Notable people with the surname include:

Gregory Jagenburg (born 1957), American swimmer 
Hans Jagenburg (1894–1971), Swedish high jumper

Germanic-language surnames